Fritz "Iwo" Dölling (12 January 1923 – 22 April 2019) was a Swedish diplomat.

Early life
Dölling was born on 12 January 1923 in Vaxholm, Sweden, the son of major Fritz Dölling and Margit (née Zander). He passed his reserve officers exam in 1944 and Candidate of Law in Stockholm in 1949 before he became attaché at the Ministry for Foreign Affairs in the same year.

Career
Dölling was attaché and secretary of the Swedish OEEC delegation in Paris from 1950 to 1955, secretary at the embassy in Bonn from 1955 to 1957 and secretary at the legation in Pretoria from 1957 to 1960. Dölling was first secretary at the Ministry for Foreign Affairs from 1960 to 1963, commercial counsellor in London from 1963 to 1964 and was embassy counsellor and deputy head of Swedish EEC delegation in Brussels from 1965 to 1970. He was minister in Brussels from 1970 to 1972. After that Dölling was Swedish ambassador in Lusaka from 1972 to 1975, in Tel Aviv from 1975 to 1979 and in Athens from 1980 to 1985.

Dölling held UN assignments as trade policy advisor in Kenya from 1964 to 1965. He was part of the UN delegation in 1979. From 1986 he was counselor at Atlas Copco.

Personal life
In 1950 Dölling married Tatiana Dushmanitch (born 1924), daughter of colonel Vladimir Dushmanitch and Constance Rowan.

References

1923 births
2019 deaths
Ambassadors of Sweden to Greece
Ambassadors of Sweden to Israel
Ambassadors of Sweden to Zambia
People from Vaxholm Municipality